This is a list of 195 species in Scarites, a genus of ground beetles in the family Carabidae.

Scarites species

 Scarites abbreviatus Dejean, 1825 c g
 Scarites aberrans Bänninger, 1941 c g
 Scarites acutidens Chaudoir, 1855 c g
 Scarites aestuans Klug, 1853 c g
 Scarites afghanus A. Jedlička, 1967 c g
 Scarites angulifrons Chaudoir, 1881 c g
 Scarites angustesulcatus Baehr, 2002 c g
 Scarites angustus (Chaudoir, 1855) c g
 Scarites anomalus Andrewes, 1930 c g
 Scarites anthracinus Dejean, 1831 c g
 Scarites aterrimus A. Morawitz, 1863 c g
 Scarites atronitens Fairmaire, 1887 c g
 Scarites baenningeri van Emden, 1932 c g
 Scarites barbarus Dejean, 1825 c g
 Scarites basiplicatus Heyden, 1884 c g
 Scarites batesi Andrewes, 1929 c g
 Scarites beesoni Andrewes, 1929 c g
 Scarites bengalensis Dejean, 1826 c g
 Scarites biangulatus Fairmaire, 1898 c g
 Scarites birmanicus (H. W. Bates, 1892) c g
 Scarites bokalensis Bänninger, 1932 c g
 Scarites bonariensis (Chaudoir, 1881) c g
 Scarites bottegoi Bänninger, 1937 c g
 Scarites boucardi Chaudoir, 1881 c g
 Scarites bruchi Bänninger, 1932 c g
 Scarites bucida (Pallas, 1776) c g
 Scarites buparius (J. R. Forster, 1771) c g
 Scarites carinatus Dejean, 1825 c g
 Scarites cayennensis Dejean, 1825 c g
 Scarites ceylonicus Chaudoir, 1881 c g
 Scarites colossus Csiki, 1927 c g
 Scarites comoricus Alluaud, 1932 c g
 Scarites convexipennis Fairmaire, 1869 c g
 Scarites convexiusculus (Chaudoir, 1881) c g
 Scarites corbetti Andrewes, 1929 c g
 Scarites cormoides Andrewes, 1929 c g
 Scarites corvinus Dejean, 1831 c g
 Scarites costipennis Péringuey, 1896 c g
 Scarites crassus Andrewes, 1929 c g
 Scarites cubanus (Bänninger, 1937) c g
 Scarites cultripalpis Quedenfeldt, 1883 c g
 Scarites cycloderus Chaudoir, 1881 c g
 Scarites cyclops Crotch, 1871 c g
 Scarites cylindriformis Bänninger, 1933 c g
 Scarites cylindronotus Faldermann, 1836 c g
 Scarites defletus Bänninger, 1933 c g
 Scarites denticulatus Chaudoir, 1881 c g
 Scarites deplanatus (Bänninger, 1937) c g
 Scarites derogatus Andrewes, 1929 c g
 Scarites discoidalis Bänninger, 1938 c g
 Scarites distinguendus Chaudoir, 1855 c g
 Scarites doguereaui Gory, 1833 c g
 Scarites dubiosus Andrewes, 1929 c g
 Scarites dubius Bänninger, 1941 c g
 Scarites dyschromus Chaudoir, 1855 c g
 Scarites ecuadorensis Bänninger, 1941 c g
 Scarites edentatus Bänninger, 1932 c g
 Scarites emarginatus Herbst, 1806 c g
 Scarites epaphius Chaudoir, 1881 c g
 Scarites estriatus Fairmaire, 1887 c g
 Scarites eurytus Fischer von Waldheim, 1828 g
 Scarites exaratus Dejean, 1825 c g
 Scarites excavatus W. Kirby, 1819 c g
 Scarites fairmairei Bänninger, 1933 c g
 Scarites fatuus Karsch, 1881 c g
 Scarites feanus Bänninger, 1937 c g
 Scarites ferus Bänninger, 1933 c g
 Scarites fletcheri Andrewes, 1929 c g
 Scarites furcatus Bänninger, 1941 c g
 Scarites giachinoi (Bulirsch, 2019) c g
 Scarites granulatus Andrewes, 1929 c g
 Scarites gratus (Chaudoir, 1855) c g
 Scarites guerini (Chaudoir, 1855) c g
 Scarites guineensis Dejean, 1831 c g
 Scarites haidingeri Heer, 1861 c g
 Scarites heterogrammus Perty, 1830 c g
 Scarites holcocranius (Chaudoir, 1881) c g
 Scarites hypsipus Alluaud, 1917 c g
 Scarites illustris Chaudoir, 1881 c g
 Scarites impressus Fabricius, 1801 c g
 Scarites inaequalis Fairmaire, 1893 c g
 Scarites inconspicuus Chaudoir, 1855 c g
 Scarites indus G. A. Olivier, 1795 i c g
 Scarites interpositus (Bänninger, 1933) c g
 Scarites jakli Bulirsch, 2017 c g
 Scarites kabakovi (Dostal, 1997) c g
 Scarites klapperichi Bänninger, 1956 c g
 Scarites laevigatus Fabricius, 1792 c g
 Scarites lebasii (Chaudoir, 1855) c g
 Scarites limitaneus Andrewes, 1932 c g
 Scarites linearis Boheman, 1848 c g
 Scarites liopterus Chaudoir, 1881 c g
 Scarites liostracus Alluaud, 1930 c g
 Scarites lissopterus Chaudoir, 1881 i c g b
 Scarites lomaensis Basilewsky, 1972 c g
 Scarites longiusculus Chaudoir, 1881 c g
 Scarites lubricipennis S. Minowa, 1932 c g
 Scarites lucidus (Chaudoir, 1881) c g
 Scarites lunicollis Bänninger, 1933 c g
 Scarites madagascariensis Dejean, 1831 c g
 Scarites malangensis Quedenfeldt, 1883 c g
 †Scarites mancus J. F. Zhang, D. E. Liu & Shangguan, 1989 c g
 Scarites mandarinus Bänninger, 1928 c g
 Scarites mandibularis Andrewes, 1929 c g
 Scarites mandli A. Jedlička, 1963 c g
 Scarites marinus S. W. Nichols, 1986 i c g b
 Scarites mayumbensis Bänninger, 1933 c g
 Scarites melanarius Dejean, 1831 c g
 Scarites meridionalis Bänninger, 1941 c g
 Scarites migiurtinus Gui. Müller, 1944 c g
 Scarites minowai Habu, 1947 c g
 Scarites modestus (Chaudoir, 1881) c g
 Scarites moreti (Bulirsch, 2021) c g
 Scarites multisetosus Bänninger, 1941 c g
 Scarites natalensis Boheman, 1848 c g
 Scarites nigritus Boheman, 1848 c g
 Scarites nitens Andrewes, 1929 c g
 Scarites nitidiceps Baehr, 2002 c g
 Scarites nitidulus Klug, 1862 c g
 Scarites oberthueri Bänninger, 1938 c g
 Scarites obliteratus Bänninger, 1941 c g
 Scarites ocalensis S. W. Nichols, 1986 i c g
 Scarites onorei (Bulirsch, 2019) c g
 Scarites orthomus Chaudoir, 1855 c g
 Scarites palawanensis Bulirsch, 2017 c g
 Scarites paraguayensis Bänninger, 1928 c g
 Scarites parallelus Dejean, 1825 c g
 Scarites passaloides Quedenfeldt, 1883 c g
 Scarites patroclus Murray, 1857 c g
 Scarites patruelis LeConte, 1845 c g
 Scarites perplexus Dejean, 1825 c g
 Scarites pinguis Andrewes, 1929 c g
 Scarites planatus Dejean, 1831 c g
 Scarites planiusculus (Chaudoir, 1855) c g
 Scarites politus Bonelli, 1813 i c g
 Scarites polyphemus Herbst, 1806 c g
 Scarites praedator Chaudoir, 1881 c g
 Scarites procerus Dejean, 1825 c g
 Scarites productus Bänninger, 1933 c g
 Scarites pronotalis Bänninger, 1941 c g
 Scarites punctum Wiedemann, 1823 c g
 Scarites quadratus Fabricius, 1801 c g
 Scarites quadriceps Chaudoir, 1843 i c g b
 Scarites quadricostis Chaudoir, 1881 c g
 Scarites quadrimaculatus Gravenhorst, 1807 c g
 Scarites quadripunctatus Dejean, 1825 c g
 Scarites raptor Andrewes, 1932 c g
 Scarites reductus Bänninger, 1933 c g
 Scarites reichei (Chaudoir, 1881) c g
 Scarites retusus Andrewes, 1929 c g
 Scarites richteri Chaudoir, 1847 c g
 †Scarites robustiventris Théobald, 1937 c g
 Scarites rugatus (Chaudoir, 1881) c g
 Scarites rugiceps Wiedemann, 1823 c g
 Scarites rugicollis Dejean, 1825 c g
 Scarites rugosus Wiedemann, 1821 c g
 Scarites salinus Dejean, 1825 c g
 Scarites saxicola Bonelli, 1813 c g
 Scarites scaevus Andrewes, 1929 c g
 Scarites schubarti Bänninger, 1939 c g
 Scarites selene Schmidt-Goebel, 1846 c g
 Scarites semicircularis W. S. MacLeay, 1825 c g
 Scarites senegalensis Dejean, 1825 c g
 Scarites seriepunctatus (Bänninger, 1933) c g
 Scarites setosus Bänninger, 1941 c g
 Scarites sexualis Bänninger, 1938 c g
 Scarites silvestris Laporte, 1835 c g
 Scarites similis Chaudoir, 1881 c g
 Scarites simogonus Chaudoir, 1881 c g
 Scarites spectabilis (Chaudoir, 1881) c g
 Scarites stenodes Andrewes, 1929 c g
 Scarites stenops Bousquet & Skelley, 2010 i c g b
 Scarites striatus Dejean, 1825 c g
 Scarites strigifrons Baehr, 2002 c g
 Scarites stygicus (Chaudoir, 1881) c g
 Scarites subcostatus (Chaudoir, 1881) c g
 Scarites subcylindricus Chaudoir, 1843 c g
 Scarites subnitens Chaudoir, 1855 c g
 Scarites subpatroclus Basilewsky, 1972 c g
 Scarites subrugatus Chaudoir, 1881 c g
 Scarites subsulcatus Dejean, 1831 c g
 Scarites subterraneus Fabricius, 1775 i c g b  (big-headed ground beetle)
 Scarites sulcatus G. A. Olivier, 1795 c g
 Scarites sulciceps (Chaudoir, 1855) c g
 Scarites sulcifrons (Chaudoir, 1855) c g
 Scarites tauropus Andrewes, 1929 c g
 Scarites tenebricosus Dejean, 1831 c g
 Scarites terricola Bonelli, 1813 c g
 Scarites texanus Chaudoir, 1881 c g
 Scarites thiemei (Bänninger, 1933) c g
 Scarites timorensis Bänninger, 1949 c g
 Scarites trachydermon Andrewes, 1936 c g
 Scarites turkestanicus Heyden, 1884 c g
 Scarites unicus S. Minowa, 1932 c g
 Scarites urbanus S. Minowa, 1932 c g
 Scarites vicinus Chaudoir, 1843 i b
 Scarites vilcanotanus (Bänninger, 1932) c g
 Scarites vilhenai (Basilewsky, 1955) c g
 Scarites wittei (Bänninger, 1933) c g
 Scarites zambo Steinheil, 1875 c g
 Scarites zikani Bänninger, 1941 c g

Data sources: i = ITIS, c = Catalogue of Life, g = GBIF, b = Bugguide.net

References

Scarites